Radcliffe Football Club (formerly Radcliffe Borough) is an English football club based in Radcliffe, Greater Manchester where they play their games at Stainton Park. The club was formed on 24 May 1949 and currently plays in the Northern Premier League Premier Division. Radcliffe won the division in 1996–97, won the playoffs twice in 2003 and 2019 and reached the first round of the FA Cup for the first time in its history in 2000. The club changed its name to Radcliffe Football Club for the 2018–19 season.

History

The club was formed on 24 May 1949 at the Owd Tower Inn in Radcliffe by Jack Pickford & a committee of 17 and became a member of the South East Lancashire Football League. After a short period in that league, the club joined the Manchester League before gaining access to the Lancashire Football Combination in 1963. In 1972, Radcliffe won the League Cup and finished third in the league. Two years later it was accepted into the Cheshire League, which subsequently became the North West Counties League.

The first season again brought success when Radcliffe secured the Second Division championship in front of a record Stainton Park crowd of 1,468. After one season in the First Division, Radcliffe lifted the First Division championship in 1985 and made the step up into the newly formed Northern Premier League First Division in 1987. After many years of consolidation in the league, and at times, fighting against relegation, the 1995–96 season saw an upturn in the club's fortunes, both on and off the pitch. The club, for the first time in its history, reached the last 16 of the FA Trophy, narrowly losing to Football Conference side, Gateshead 2–1.

Under previous manager Kevin Glendon who was at the club for 22 years, the playing side had gone from strength to strength. Kevin is renowned for producing young players and selling them on, in total he has made £80,000 in selling players. Radcliffe achieved its highest honour in the 1996–97 season, winning the Northern Premier League First Division title by 2 points ahead of local rivals Leigh RMI. Unfortunately, the club's stay in the 'top flight' lasted only one season. Having sacrificed all its revenue on ground development, to allow it to be promoted, it found itself without the resources to invest in quality players to stay in the division. Each year since then, however, it has competed for promotion, finishing regularly in the top six.

For the first time in its history the club reached the first round of the FA Cup in 2000, losing 1–4 to York City in a match played at Gigg Lane, the home of Bury, in front of a crowd of 2,495. Boro again missed out on promotion in the 2001–02 season when after leading the division until February a poor run to the end of the season, meant that the club entered the newly formed play-offs losing to Bamber Bridge in the semi-final at Irongate.

In the 2002–03 season Boro missed out on the championship by two points to Alfreton Town, and reached the 4th qualifying round of the FA Cup, losing to Chester City in front of 1,138 at Stainton Park. Promotion was finally won thanks to the play-offs by beating North Ferriby United in the semi-final and Chorley in the final at Stainton Park winning 4–2 on penalties after Chorley scored two goals in the last 10 minutes to make it 2–2 and take the game into extra time. Boro's Jody Banim got 46 goals in what was an unbelievable season for him.

With Boro back in the Northern Premier League Premier Division and a place in the newly formed Conference North up for grabs, promotion was obviously the aim. By November Boro were as high as sixth thanks to the 22 goals of Jody Banim who set an English record by scoring in 14 consecutive games. Boro sold Banim to Conference promotion chasers Shrewsbury Town for a record fee of £20,000 in December 2003, and without his goals the club slid down the table eventually finishing 19th and into the relegation play-offs beating Whitby Town on penalties 8–7 in the quarter-finals, before bowing out to Burscough in the semi-finals at home. In 2004–05 the club finished 9th in the Northern Premier League. The club continued to be near the play-offs and solid midtable finishes followed but after 4 seasons were relegated back to the first division in 2007, where the club have remained until 2019. Mid-table finishes and the occasional battle against relegation was the order of the next decade after a decade of success and a few cup runs.

In 2016 management changed, a new chairman and manager took the reins. Off the field investment was given to the stadium, much needed after many years, a new stand at the Pilkington Road end of the stadium, a new press area and director's area after being destroyed by fire. And a new covered turnstile block, a TV Gantry, Boardroom, club shop, Sponsors Lounge and Social Club. Giving the stadium a fresh new look. The club changed name dropping the borough officially in 2018. Reaching the Lancashire Cup Final in 2017 nearly brought silverware to the new era. League finishes for the first two seasons were roughly the same as before. But with a new manager in charge Jon Macken with Frank Sinclair as his assistant brought some positive results towards the end of 2017–18 from when he took the reins in October 2017. The future looked bright and the hard work and investment on and off the pitch paid off as the club was promoted via the play-offs back to the Northern Premier League in 2019.

In February 2023 the club signed David Goodwillie who was found to be a rapist in a civil trial in Scotland and ordered to pay the victim £100,000.

Current squad

Notable players

The following players have played for Boro and at the highest levels of English football.

 Gordon Armstrong
 Peter Barnes
 Ian Bishop
 Raúl Correia
 Nick Culkin
 Neil Danns
 Craig Dawson
 George Glendon
 Jem Karacan
 Alan Kennedy
 Chris Makin
 Darren Sheridan
 Frank Worthington

Honours

League
Northern Premier League Division One champions (1): 1996–97
Northern Premier League Division One Play Off winners (2): 2002–03 2018–19
North West Counties League First Division champions (1): 1984–85
North West Counties League Second Division champions (1): 1982–83
South Lancashire League Division One champions (1): 1951–52
South Lancashire League Division Two champions (1): 1950–51

Cup
FA Cup 1st Round 2000–01
FA Trophy 3rd Round 1995–96
FA Vase 4th Round 1993–94
Northern Premier League President's Cup Finalists : 2007–08
Manchester Premier Cup winners (1)'' 2007–08
South Lancashire League Shield winners (3): 1949–50, 1950–51, 1951–52
South Lancashire Cup winners (3): 1950–51, 1952–53, 1954–55
Lancashire League Cup winners (1): 1969–70
Manchester League Gylchrist Cup winners (2): 1958–59, 1961–62
Bury Amateur League Cup winners (1): 1949–50
Lancashire FA County Cup (0): Finalist 2008–09, 2016–17

Statistics and records
Simon Kelly has made the most appearances for the club, making 502 starts.

Ian Lunt has scored the most goals for the club, scoring 147 times. 
The record for the most goals in a season is 46 by Jody Banim.

Their highest attendance overall came in the FA Cup first round in 2000 when they faced York City. 2,495 people went to see the game. Their highest attendance at home was against Caernarfon Town when 1,468 people went to the game. The ground record, however, stands with a non-Radcliffe game when 2,200 turned up to watch FC United vs Castleton Gabriells (now known as Rochdale Town).

Their highest transfer fee they received was from Shrewsbury Town for £20,000 for Jody Banim; however, the club has received more in add on fees from the sale of Craig Dawson to Rochdale AFC although the total sum remains undisclosed.

The highest transfer fee they paid was for Gary Walker for whom they paid £5,000 to Buxton.

The club has performed exceptionally well in the Northern Premier League's Player awards since their inception in 2011. The following players have picked up the following prizes:

Elliot Rokka – Young Player of the Season (North Division) – 2017, Supporters Player Runner Up 2017. Team of the Season 2017
Tunde Owolabi – League Supporters Player of the Season – 2019, Team of the Season 2019
Nick Culkin –  Team of the Season 2011
Sheldon Barrington – Academy Player of the Season 2019
Callum Grogan – Team of the Season 2019

References

External links
Official website

 Club Facebook

 
Football clubs in England
Association football clubs established in 1949
Northern Premier League clubs
Football clubs in the Metropolitan Borough of Bury
Lancashire Combination
1949 establishments in England
North West Counties Football League clubs
Radcliffe, Greater Manchester
Cheshire County League clubs